Alec George Burns (born 23 July 1948) is a former cricketer who played first-class and List A cricket for  Trinidad and Tobago and East Trinidad from 1971 to 1981.

Burns was a fast-medium bowler and lower-order batsman. He helped Trinidad and Tobago win the final of the Geddes Grant/Harrison Line Trophy in 1978-79 and 1980-81. In 1978-79, he made 21 not out and took 5 for 40 and won the man of the match award. In 1980-81, he took 2 for 26 off 10 overs and was not required to bat in Trinidad and Tobago's four-wicket victory. He later served as chief selector for the Trinidad and Tobago team.

His son Marc Burns is an Olympic sprinter.

References

External links
 
 Alec Burns at CricketArchive

1948 births
Living people
Trinidad and Tobago cricketers
East Trinidad cricketers